"Why Do I Do?" is the debut single by British singer-songwriter Tyler James, released as a digital download in the United Kingdom on 1 November 2004. The song is from his debut album studio album The Unlikely Lad (2005). It peaked at number 25 on the UK Singles Chart.

Track listings

Chart performance

Release history

References

2004 songs
2004 debut singles
Tyler James (English musician) songs
Songs written by Blair MacKichan
Island Records singles